{{Automatic taxobox
| taxon = Wairarapa 
| image = Wairarapa duplaris 001.jpg
| image_caption = Wairarapa duplaris
| authority = Vella, 1954
| synonyms_ref = 
| type_species = † Wairarapa rebecca
| type_species_authority = Vella, 1954
| subdivision_ranks = Species
| subdivision = See text
| display_parents = 3
}}Wairarapa is a genus of sea snails, marine gastropod mollusks in the family Drilliidae.

Description
This genus was proposed by Vella in 1954 for species resembling Splendrillia, but having a different protoconch, another subsutural fold and showing a stromboid notch

Distribution
The species type of this genus is extinct and was endemic to New Zealand. W. duplaris occurs off North Australia to Queensland, Auistralia.

Species
 Wairarapa duplaris (Hedley, 1922)
 † Wairarapa rebecca'' Vella, 1954

References

 Hedley, Charles. A revision of the Australian Turridae. Vol. 13. 1922

External links
 Vella, Paul. "Tertiary Mollusca from south-east Wairarapa." Transactions of the Royal Society of New Zealand. Vol. 81. No. 4. 1954.
  Tucker, J.K. 2004 Catalog of recent and fossil turrids (Mollusca: Gastropoda). Zootaxa 682:1-1295.

 
Gastropods of New Zealand
Gastropods of Australia